Coequosa australasiae is a species of moth of the family Sphingidae.

Distribution 
It is known from New South Wales, the Northern Territory, Queensland and Victoria.

Description 
The wingspan is about 120 mm. The forewings are light and dark brown with a variable wavy pattern and the hindwings are orange with a brown trailing edge.

Biology 
The larvae feed on the foliage of Eucalyptus species. They have a large last abdominal segment and a tiny forked head. They are green and covered in small warts. There is a diagonal yellow stripe on each side of each abdominal segment. Full-grown larvae are about 120 mm long. Pupation takes place in a dark brown pupa which is formed in a sparse cocoon in the ground litter.

References

Smerinthini
Moths described in 1805